WDKA (channel 49) is a television station licensed to Paducah, Kentucky, United States, serving as the MyNetworkTV affiliate for Western Kentucky's Purchase region, Southern Illinois and Southeastern Missouri, and Northwest Tennessee. It is owned by the Community News Media subsidiary of Standard Media alongside Cape Girardeau, Missouri–licensed Fox affiliate KBSI (channel 23). Both stations share studios on Enterprise Street in Cape Girardeau, while WDKA's transmitter is located in Vienna, Illinois.

In addition to its own digital signal, WDKA is simulcast in standard definition on KBSI's second digital subchannel (23.2) from a transmitter north of Cape Girardeau in unincorporated Cape Girardeau County.

History
WDKA began broadcasting on June 5, 1997. It was a UPN affiliate broadcasting an analog signal on UHF channel 49. In 2000, WDKA switched affiliations with low-powered station WQTV-LP (licensed to Murray, Kentucky) and repeater WQWQ-LP to become an affiliate of The WB. In September 2006, The WB and UPN merged to become The CW, and WQTV-LP was announced to become The CW affiliate for Paducah in advance of the merger. As a result, WDKA became affiliated with MyNetworkTV when it launched on September 5. 

On August 30, 2014, WDKA became a charter affiliate of Sinclair's ad-hoc syndicated television network, the American Sports Network. ASN provided Ohio Valley Conference basketball and Conference USA football and basketball games to the station's viewers. The ASN's programming content replaced Southeastern Conference football and basketball broadcasts from ESPN Plus-oriented SEC TV, which was run from 2009 until 2014, which was discontinued because of the launch of the pay TV-exclusive SEC Network. 

On March 3, 2016, WDKA Acquisition Corporation (owned by Paul T. Lucci) filed to sell WDKA to Sinclair's subsidiary WDKA Licensee, LLC. Sinclair bought the station for $1.9 million. The sale was completed on September 1, 2017.

Subchannel history

WDKA-DT2
WDKA-DT2 previously aired TheCoolTV from 2010 until August 31, 2012. It went silent for two years before becoming a GetTV affiliate in Summer 2014. On February 28, 2017, WDKA-DT2 became affiliated with an action-based network Charge! with GetTV moving to 49.4. On that day, GetTV was relocated to a DT4 subchannel.

WDKA-DT3
As a part of a deal involving several Sinclair-owned stations similar to the earlier deal between Sinclair and TheCoolTV, WDKA-DT3 was added to carry The Country Network on September 18, 2010. The Country Network changed its name and was rebranded to ZUUS Country on June 1, 2013. In 2016, ZUUS Country was rebranded to The Country Network. On February 28, 2017, WDKA-DT3 became affiliated with the TBD network.

Technical information

Subchannels
The station's digital signal is multiplexed:

Analog-to-digital conversion
WDKA shut down its analog signal, over UHF channel 49, on February 17, 2009, the original target date in which full-power television stations in the United States were to transition from analog to digital broadcasts under federal mandate (which was pushed back to June 12, 2009). The station's digital signal remained on its pre-transition UHF channel 50. Through the use of PSIP, digital television receivers display the station's virtual channel as its former UHF analog channel 49.

Spectrum reallocation
In October 2019, WDKA reallocated its digital signal onto UHF channel 25 as a result of the station's participation in the FCC's spectrum incentive auction.

References

External links
WDKA channel 50
KBSI "Fox 23"

Paducah, Kentucky
MyNetworkTV affiliates
Charge! (TV network) affiliates
TBD (TV network) affiliates
Stadium (sports network) affiliates
Dabl affiliates
Television channels and stations established in 1997
Television stations in the Paducah–Cape Girardeau–Harrisburg market
1997 establishments in Kentucky